Timothy Marcus Cole (born 2 May 1965 in Cuckfield, West Sussex) is a former British diplomat, most recently serving as Migration Envoy at the Foreign and Commonwealth Office.

Personal
Cole studied at Durham University.

Career
After some years working for international aid organisations Christian Aid and Save the Children, he joined the Foreign Office in 2001. An Africa specialist, he was Deputy Head of Mission in Maputo (2006–2009) and Harare (2009–2012), before his appointment as Ambassador to Cuba (2012–2016).

References

1965 births
Living people
Ambassadors of the United Kingdom to Cuba
People from Cuckfield
Members of HM Diplomatic Service
Alumni of St Aidan's College, Durham
21st-century British diplomats